The 2022 Sutton London Borough Council election took place on 5 May 2022. All 55 members of Sutton London Borough Council were elected. The elections took place alongside local elections in the other London boroughs and elections to local authorities across the United Kingdom.

In the previous election in 2018, the Liberal Democrats maintained their longstanding control of the council, winning 33 out of the 54 seats with the Conservative Party forming the principal opposition with eighteen of the remaining 21 seats. The 2022 election took place under new election boundaries, which increased the number of councillors to 55.

Background

History 

The thirty-two London boroughs were established in 1965 by the London Government Act 1963. They are the principal authorities in Greater London and have responsibilities including education, housing, planning, highways, social services, libraries, recreation, waste, environmental health and revenue collection. Some of the powers are shared with the Greater London Authority, which also manages passenger transport, police and fire.

After its formation, Sutton was under Conservative control until 1986. After a brief period of no overall control, the Liberal Democrats gained a majority on the council and have maintained overall control since. In the most recent council election in 2018, the Liberal Democrats won 33 seats with 38.8% of the vote while the Conservatives won 18 seats with 36.3% of the vote across the borough. The remaining three seats were won by independent candidates. One of the independents was a former Liberal Democrat opposed to plans to build an incinerator.

Council term 

A Conservative councillor for Belmont ward, Patrick McManus, resigned in September 2018. The by-election in October 2018 was held for the Conservatives by Neil Garratt, a former councillor and deputy leader of the Conservative group who had lost his seat in the May 2018 council election. The Liberal Democrats came second, reducing the Conservative majority compared to May. Joyce Melican, a Liberal Democrat councillor for Wallington North, resigned in February 2019 for health reasons. She had served as a councillor since 2010. The Liberal Democrat candidate Barry Lewis won the seat in the 29 March 2019 by-election with a reduced majority against the Conservatives.

As with most London boroughs, Sutton were electing its councillors under new boundaries decided by the Local Government Boundary Commission for England, which it produced after a period of consultation. The number of councillors rose from 54 to 55 and the commission produced new boundaries following a period of consultation, with fifteen three-member wards and five two-member wards.

Electoral process 
Sutton, like other London borough councils, elects all of its councillors at once every four years. The previous election took place in 2018. The 2022 election took place by multi-member first-past-the-post voting, with each ward being represented by two or three councillors. Electors had as many votes as there are councillors to be elected in their ward, with the top two or three being elected.

All registered electors (British, Irish, Commonwealth and European Union citizens) living in London aged 18 or over were entitled to vote in the election. People who live at two addresses in different councils, such as university students with different term-time and holiday addresses, were entitled to be registered for and vote in elections in both local authorities. Voting in-person at polling stations will take place from 7:00 to 22:00 on election day, and voters were able to apply for postal votes or proxy votes in advance of the election.

Council composition

Results summary

Ward Results

Beddington

Belmont

Carshalton Central

Carshalton South & Clockhouse

Cheam

Hackbridge

North Cheam

South Beddington & Roundshaw

St Helier East

St Helier West

Stonecot

Sutton Central

Sutton North

Sutton South

Sutton West & East Cheam

The Wrythe

Wallington North

Wallington South

Worcester Park North

Worcester Park South

References 

Council elections in the London Borough of Sutton
Sutton